Barclay Palmer (born William Barclay Livingstone Palmer; 2 March 1932 – 27 September 2020) was a British athlete who competed in the shot put discipline at the 1956 Summer Olympics.

He was educated at Monkton Combe School in Somerset and at St Peter's College, Oxford where he gained an Athletics Blue in 1953 for shot put (then called weights), discus and javelin.

References

1932 births
2020 deaths
People educated at Monkton Combe School
British male shot putters
Olympic athletes of Great Britain
Athletes (track and field) at the 1956 Summer Olympics
Alumni of St Peter's College, Oxford